Thelaira leucozona is a species of fly in the family Tachinidae first described by Georg Wolfgang Franz Panzer in 1806.
 It parasitizes moths such as Arctia caja by laying eggs in the larvae that eventually kill the host.

Distribution
Austria, Bulgaria, Czech Republic, France, Germany, Hungary, Italy, Latvia, Poland, Switzerland and United Kingdom

References

Diptera of Europe
Taxa named by Georg Wolfgang Franz Panzer
Dexiinae
Insects described in 1806